Likoma is a genus of moths in the family Sphingidae first described by Walter Rothschild and Karl Jordan in 1903.

Species
Likoma apicalis (Rothschild & Jordan 1903)
Likoma crenata Rothschild & Jordan 1907

References

Smerinthini
Moth genera
Taxa named by Walter Rothschild
Taxa named by Karl Jordan